Koranattukarupur is a village in the Kumbakonam taluk of Thanjavur district, Tamil Nadu, India.

Demographics 

As per the 2001 census, Koranattukarupur had a total population of 8,135 with 4,030 males and 4,105 females. The sex ratio was 975. The literacy rate was 78.22

References 

 

Villages in Thanjavur district